This is a list of all cricketers who have played first-class, list A or Twenty20 cricket for Mumbai cricket team (formerly called Bombay cricket team). Seasons given are first and last seasons; the player did not necessarily play in all the intervening seasons. Players in bold have played international cricket.

Last updated at the end of the 2015/16 season.

A
 Iqbal Abdulla, 2006/07-2015/16
 Khan Abdulla, 1951/52
 Abu Abraham, 1955/56
 Sudhakar Adhikari, 1959/60-1966/67
 Ajit Agarkar, 1996/97-2012/13
 Badre Alam, 2014/15-2015/16
 Mohini Amladi, 1951/52-1952/53
 Vasant Amladi, 1947/48-1949/50
 Pravin Amre, 1986/87-1998/99
 Hoshang Amroliwala, 1956/57-1963/64
 Salil Ankola, 1990/91-1996/97
 S Anwar, 1938/39
 Anwar Hussain, 1943/44-1945/46 (played international cricket for Pakistan)
 Arvind Apte, 1957/58-1964/65
 Madhav Apte, 1951/52-1967/68
 Sheshil Arolkar, 1941/42
 Kiran Asher, 1968/69-1977/78

B
 Harmeet Singh Baddhan, 2009/10-2015/16
 Sairaj Bahutule, 1991/92-2008/09
 Ranjan Baindoor, 1975/76-1984/85
 Shamsher Baloch, 1946/47
 Subhash Bandiwadekar, 1973/74-1976/77
 Ahmed Baporia, 1934/35-1937/38
 Maganlal Bhagwandas, 1934/35-1935/36
 AK Bhalerao, 1941/42
 Zubin Bharucha, 1992/93-1995/96
 Vijay Bhosle, 1967/68-1970/71
 Jitendra Bhutta, 1968/69
 Jay Bista, 2014/15-2015/16
 Vishwanath Bondre, 1965/66-1969/70
 Chandu Borde, 1954/55

C
 Nariman Canteenwala, 1936/37-1937/38
 Raghunath Chandorkar, 1950/51
 Mrudul Chaturvedi, 1984/85
 Ankeet Chavan, 2007/08-2012/13
 HE Cheetham, 1902/03
 Siddharth Chitnis, 2009/10-2015/16
 Padmakar Chury, 1934/35
 Frederick Clarke, 1892/93
 Sorabji Colah, 1926/27-1933/34
 Hormasji Contractor, 1934/35-1935/36
 Hoshedar Contractor, 1982/83
 Rustom Cooper, 1943/44-1944/45
 Edward Cox, 1892/93

D
 Vishal Dabholkar, 2012/13-2015/16
 HM Dadachanji, 1953/54
 Prathamesh Dake, 2013/14-2014/15
 Madhav Dalvi, 1947/48-1959/60
 Madhukar Dalvi, 1952/53
 Amit Dani, 1995/96-2001/02
 Bal Dani, 1954/55
 Avi D'Avoine, 1934/35
 John Davy, 1902/03
 Suresh Deobakht, 1971/72
 Avinash Desai, 1952/53-1957/58
 Prasad Desai, 1989/90-1992/93
 Ramakant Desai, 1958/59-1968/69
 Tushar Deshpande, 2014/15
 Patrick Dickinson, 1947/48-1948/49
 Sameer Dighe, 1990/91-2001/02
 Ajay Divecha, 1962/63
 Ramesh Divecha, 1951/52
 KN Divekar, 1934/35-1936/37
 Sharad Diwadkar, 1957/58-1966/67
 SS Dongree, 1934/35
 Peter Dowson, 1937/38
 John du Cane, 1892/93
 Shivam Dubey, 2015/16

E
 Farokh Engineer, 1959/60-1974/75
 Maneck Engineer, 1941/42
 Ashok Eshwalkar, 1985/86

F
 Leonard Furber, 1902/03

G
 Ravi Gadiyar, 1994/95
 Edulji Gai, 1934/35
 B. K. Garudachar, 1943/44
 Sunil Gavaskar, 1967/68-1986/87
 Mazhar Ghadially, 1993/94
 Karsan Ghavri, 1973/74-1981/82
 Shankarrao Godambe, 1926/27-1939/40
 VV Godbole, 1964/65
 Behram Govadia, 1950/51-1961/62
 John Greig, 1902/03
 Ghulam Guard, 1947/48-1961/62
 Baloo Gupte, 1953/54-1967/68
 Gurudut Gupte, 1980/81
 Subhash Gupte, 1948/49-1958/59
 Omkar Gurav, 2007/08-2011/12
 Rajesh Gurav, 1992/93

H
 Abdul Hakim, 1933/34-1941/42
 Mahendra Hansoti, 1935/36
 Manohar Hardikar, 1955/56-1967/68
 Shishir Hattangadi, 1981/82-1991/92
 Saeed Hatteea, 1969/70-1970/71
 Dadabhoy Havewala, 1934/35-1941/42
 JP Havewala, 1933/34
 Sharad Hazare, 1964/65-1976/77
 Swapnil Hazare, 2000/01-2006/07
 Salebhoy Heptullah, 1934/35
 Akhil Herwadkar, 2011/12-2015/16
 Dattaram Hindlekar, 1934/35-1946/47
 Reginald Hopkins, 1935/36
 Bernard Howlett, 1926/27

I
 KC Ibrahim, 1940/41-1949/50
 Vinit Indulkar, 2004/05-2013/14
 Behram Irani, 1946/47-1952/53
 Mehli Irani, 1951/52-1953/54
 Rustom Irani, 1941/42
 Abdul Ismail, 1969/70-1977/78
 Shreyas Iyer, 2013/14-2015/16

J
 Rajendra Jadeja, 1978/79-1979/80
 Deepak Jadhav, 1982/83-1987/88
 Jayaprakash Jadhav, 1990/91-1991/92
 Pushkaraj Jadhav, 1999/00-2003/04
 Sanjeev Jadhav, 1989/90
 Wasim Jaffer, 1996/97-2014/15
 Laxmidas Jai, 1926/27-1941/42
 Ankush Jaiswal, 2015/16
 Rustomji Jamshedji, 1926/27-1935/36
 Sanjay Jaywant, 1975/76-1976/77
 Manoj Joglekar, 1992/93-2003/04
 Henry John, 1902/03
 SS Joshi, 1933/34

K
 SM Kadri, 1935/36-1941/42
 Bomanji Kalapesi, 1926/27-1936/37
 Prabhakar Kamat, 1952/53-1959/60
 Vinod Kambli, 1989/90-2004/05
 Shriram Kannan, 1999/00-2000/01
 Bahadur Kapadia, 1926/27
 Framroze Kapadia, 1934/35
 Hansraj Kapadia, 1950/51
 Mahesh Karanjkar, 1992/93-1995/96
 Vijay Karkhanis, 1967/68-1968/69
 Avinash Karnik, 1974/75-1977/78
 Bharat Karnik, 1994/95
 Pradeep Kasliwal, 1985/86-1988/89
 Laxman Kenny, 1938/39-1941/42
 Ramnath Kenny, 1950/51-1960/61
 Badruddin Khan
 Iqbal Khan, 1986/87-1994/95
 Javed Khan, 2010/11-2014/15
 Sarfaraz Khan, 2013/14-2014/15
 Zaheer Khan, 2006/07-2013/14
 Shreyas Khanolkar, 1999/00
 Onkar Khanwilkar, 2003/04-2010/11
 Sachin Khartade, 1994/95
 Aniruddha Kher, 1987/88-1988/89
 Jehangir Khot, 1935/36-1950/51
 Gopal Kohli, 1970/71
 DV Koppikar, 1938/39
 Janardan Kore, 1944/45-1947/48
 J Kotian, 1950/51
 Sharma Krishnan, 1990/91
 Subhash Kshirsagar, 1979/80-1988/89
 Sahil Kukreja, 2005/06-2010/11
 Dhawal Kulkarni, 2006/07-2015/16
 Nilesh Kulkarni, 1994/95-2007/08
 Raju Kulkarni, 1982/83-1992/93
 Ravi Kulkarni, 1978/79-1989/90
 Sulakshan Kulkarni, 1986/87-1998/99
 Umesh Kulkarni, 1963/64-1968/69
 Abey Kuruvilla, 1990/91-1999/00

L
 Siddhesh Lad, 2012/13-2015/16
 Abdul Latif, 1948/49
 JS Lawyer, 1937/38
 Rajendra Lele, 1985/86-1987/88
 Vishwanath Lele, 1953/54-1968/69
 Sunil Limaye, 1986/87-1989/90
 Harry Lowis, 1902/03
 Charles Luard, 1892/93

M
 Vishal Mahadik, 1993/94-1997/98
 Ebrahim Maka, 1944/45-1946/47
 Usman Malvi, 2002/03-2010/11
 Shridhar Mandale, 1979/80-1984/85
 Vinayak Mane, 2000/01-2008/09
 Mun Mangela, 2006/07-2010/11
 Shrideep Mangela, 2014/15-2015/16
 Sushant Manjrekar, 1999/00-2002/03
 Sanjay Manjrekar, 1984/85-1997/98
 Vijay Manjrekar, 1949/50-1955/56
 Ashok Mankad, 1963/64-1982/83
 Vinoo Mankad, 1951/52-1955/56
 Rahul Mankad, 1975/76-1984/85
 Madhav Mantri, 1941/42-1956/57
 Sushant Marathe, 2005/06-2014/15
 Khershed Meherhomji, 1933/34
 Atul Mehta, 1969/70-1971/72
 Champaklal Mehta, 1933/34-1935/36
 Uday Merchant, 1939/40-1949/50
 Vijay Merchant, 1933/34-1950/51
 Jack Meyer, 1926/27
 Paras Mhambrey, 1992/93-2002/03
 John Milne, 1902/03
 Mermadi Mistry, 1937/38-1943/44
 Rusi Modi, 1943/44-1957/58
 Urmikant Mody, 1975/76
 Vijay Mohanraj, 1975/76-1977/78
 MM Mohiuddin, 1947/48-1950/51
 Kiran Mokashi, 1980/81-1990/91
 Kunal More, 2001/02
 Shankar More, 1964/65-1966/67
 Sunil More, 1992/93-1997/98
 Robin Morris, 1996/97-2006/07
 Robert Moss, 1937/38-1939/40
 Wilkin Mota, 2003/04-2014/15
 Behram Mowadala, 1949/50-1950/51
 Murtuza Hussain, 2007/08-2011/12
 Amol Muzumdar, 1993/94-2008/09

N
 Bapu Nadkarni, 1960/61-1967/68
 Bharat Nadkarni, 1978/79
 Ramesh Nagdev, 1964/65
 Ajit Naik, 1970/71-1973/74
 Manohar Naik, 1938/39-1940/41
 Prashant Naik, 2006/07-2011/12
 Sudhir Naik, 1966/67-1977/78
 Framroze Nariman, 1937/38-1939/40
 Bharat Narvekar, 1965/66
 Sujit Nayak, 2013/14
 Suru Nayak, 1976/77-1988/89
 Abhishek Nayar, 2003/04-2015/16
 Saurabh Netravalkar, 2013/14-2014/15
 Arthur Newnham, 1892/93

P
 Amit Pagnis, 1996/97-1999/00
 Ajit Pai, 1968/69-1975/76
 Karkulu Pai, 1958/59-1962/63
 Phiroze Palia, 1937/38
 Yeshwant Palwankar, 1944/45-1954/55
 Chandrakant Pandit, 1979/80-1990/91
 Kamalkar Panjri, 1953/54-1957/58
 Jatin Paranjpe, 1991/92-2000/01
 Vasudev Paranjpe, 1961/62-1965/66
 Ghulam Parkar, 1978/79-1985/86
 Ramnath Parkar, 1970/71-1980/81
 Zulfiqar Parkar, 1977/78-1984/85
 Akash Parkar, 2014/15
 Vazirani Parsram, 1949/50
 Chandrakant Patankar, 1949/50-1965/66
 Babubhai Patel, 1935/36
 Bhavesh Patel, 2007/08
 Minoo Patel, 1937/38-1939/40
 Munaf Patel, 2003/04-2004/05
 Madhusudan Patil, 1949/50-1952/53
 Nikhil Patil, 2012/13-2015/16
 Sandeep Patil, 1975/76-1986/87
 Sanjay Patil, 1989/90-1993/94
 Vithal Patil, 1956/57-1957/58
 Nilesh Patwardhan, 2002/03
 Kaustubh Pawar, 2011/12-2013/14
 Rajesh Pawar, 1996/97-2002/03
 Akbar Peerbhoy, 1937/38
 Dudley Pelham, 1902/03
 Dattu Phadkar, 1944/45-1951/52
 Mandar Phadke, 1995/96-1999/00
 Robert Poore, 1892/93 (played international cricket for South Africa)
 Kiran Powar, 1996/97-2000/01
 Ramesh Powar, 1999/00-2012/13
 HA Printer, 1937/38

R
 Vinod Raghavan, 1994/95
 Ajinkya Rahane, 2006/07-2015/16
 Madan Raiji, 1941/42-1948/49
 Vasant Raiji, 1941/42
 Ernest Raikes, 1892/93
 Rohan Raje, 2007/08-2015/16
 Vijay Rajindernath, 1952/53
 Lalchand Rajput, 1982/83-1990/91
 Gulabrai Ramchand, 1948/49-1962/63
 Atul Ranade, 1996/97-1997/98
 Amol Rane, 1999/00-2000/01
 Khandu Rangnekar, 1940/41-1948/49
 Sharad Rao, 1980/81
 Ghulam Rasool, 1926/27
 Abhishek Raut, 2008/09-2015/16
 Milind Rege, 1967/68-1977/78
 Yatin Rele, 1953/54-1957/58
 Anup Revandkar, 2007/08-2012/13
 Grimley Richards, 1934/35-1936/37
 Pankaj Roy, 1954/55

S
 Anup Sabnis, 1987/88-1989/90
 Aavishkar Salvi, 2001/02-2012/13
 Vinayak Samant, 2002/03-2009/10
 Mahesh Sampat, 1970/71-1975/76
 Balwinder Sandhu, 1980/81-1986/87
 Balwinder Sandhu, 2008/09-2015/16
 Jignesh Sanghani, 1982/83-1988/89
 Sushil Sanghvi, 1967/68-1968/69
 Dilip Sardesai, 1960/61-1972/73
 Chandu Sarwate, 1943/44
 Ajit Sawant, 1982/83-1987/88
 Sachin Sawant, 2000/01
 Santosh Saxena, 1997/98-2000/01
 Hiken Shah, 2005/06-2014/15
 Vignesh Shahane, 1991/92-1992/93
 Aquib Shaikh, 2010/11
 Faisal Shaikh, 1997/98
 Rahil Shaikh, 2008/09-2009/10
 Shoaib Shaikh, 2009/10-2014/15
 Sufiyan Shaikh, 2014/15
 SV Shankar, 1953/54-1954/55
 Rohit Sharma, 2006/07-2015/16
 Ravi Shastri, 1979/80-1993/94
 Devdas Shenoy, 1961/62
 Bravish Shetty, 2011/12-2014/15
 Nishit Shetty, 2000/01-2006/07
 Suresh Shetty, 1982/83-1985/86
 Abhijit Shetye, 2000/01-2005/06
 Sadu Shinde, 1950/51-1954/55
 Santosh Shinde, 2004/05-2005/06
 Raju Shirke, 1990/91
 Nitin Shirodkar, 1967/68
 Padmakar Shivalkar, 1964/65-1987/88
 Yeshwant Sidhaye, 1954/55
 Reginald Sinclair, 1902/03
 Shashank Singh, 2014/15-2015/16
 Sidak Singh, 2014/15
 Alan Sippy, 1984/85-1990/91
 Ranga Sohoni, 1951/52-1954/55
 Eknath Solkar, 1966/67-1981/82
 Piyush Soneji, 1990/91-1992/93
 Frederick Sprott, 1902/03
 Sankaran Srinivasan, 1978/79
 Charlie Stayers, 1962/63 (played international cricket for West Indies)
 Herbert Stockdale, 1892/93
 Doraiswamy Subramanian, 2012/13-2013/14
 Gundibail Sunderam, 1953/54-1955/56
 MG Surti, 1934/35
 Rajesh Sutar, 1994/95-2001/02

T
 Dinkar Talpade, 1933/34-1937/38
 Sameer Talpade, 1988/89-1992/93
 Pravin Tambe, 2013/14-2015/16
 Milind Tamhane, 2002/03
 Naren Tamhane, 1953/54-1963/64
 Rakesh Tandon, 1972/73-1977/78
 Keki Tarapore, 1937/38-1948/49
 Aditya Tare, 2007/08-2015/16
 SD Telang, 1949/50
 Sachin Tendulkar, 1988/89-2013/14
 Bhavin Thakkar, 2001/02-2007/08
 Ravindra Thakkar, 1981/82-1989/90
 Jitendra Thakre, 1986/87-1988/89
 Rahul Thakur, 2003/04-2004/05
 Shardul Thakur, 2012/13-2015/16
 Suresh Tigdi, 1969/70-1970/71
 Subash Tipnis, 1963/64
 John Trask, 1892/93
 Francis Travers, 1926/27
 Herbert Trevor, 1892/93
 Sagar Trivedi, 2014/15-2015/16
 Hugh Troup, 1892/93

U
 Polly Umrigar, 1946/47-1962/63
 Thomas Usborne, 1892/93

V
 Hormasji Vajifdar, 1926/27-1935/36
 Paul Valthaty, 2005/06-2010/11
 Arun Varde, 1963/64-1967/68
 Amitabh Velaskar, 2002/03
 Dilip Vengsarkar, 1975/76-1991/92
 Rajesh Verma, 2002/03-2012/13

W
 Ajit Wadekar, 1958/59-1974/75
 Jal Wadia, 1934/35
 Raghunath Wadkar, 1934/35-1938/39
 Praful Waghela, 2004/05-2012/13
 Kshemal Waingankar, 2006/07-2014/15
 Vishwas Walawalkar, 1994/95
 WS Walcott, 1902/03

Y
 Suryakumar Yadav, 2009/10-2015/16
 Anand Yalvigi, 1996/97
 Vikrant Yeligati, 2007/08-2010/11

Z
 Avadhut Zarapkar, 1974/75-1979/80

References

Mumbai cricketers

cricketers